Karl George may refer to:

 Karl George (musician) (1913–1978), American jazz trumpeter
 Karl George (American football) (1894–1979)

See also
 George Karl (1951-), American basketball coach